Robert H. Christopherson (born October 7, 1936) is an American boxer. He competed in the men's light heavyweight event at the 1964 Summer Olympics. At the 1964 Summer Olympics, he defeated Barkat Ali of Pakistan in Round 32, before losing to Aleksei Kiselyov of the Soviet Union in Round 16 by referee decision. His teammate on the 1964 US Boxing Team, Joe Frazier, went on to win the only Summer 1964 Olympic boxing gold medal for the US.

Life after the Olympics
Christopherson served in the US Marine Corps from 1959 to 1960 and then the US Air Force from 1961 to 1965. He married in 1965 and he and his wife, Ursula, had three daughters. He graduated from the University of Wisconsin with a bachelor's of science in social work. He obtained a masters of social work (MSW) degree from New Mexico Highlands University located in Las Vegas, New Mexico.

References

1936 births
Living people
American male boxers
Olympic boxers of the United States
Boxers at the 1964 Summer Olympics
People from Pine County, Minnesota
Light-heavyweight boxers